The İzzet Pasha cabinet was headed by Grand Vizier Ahmet İzzet Pasha. It was formed on October 14, 1918 after Talaat Pasha's resignation. It was mostly composed of members of the anti-war faction of the Union and Progress Party. The most important accomplishment of the government was when Naval Minister Rauf Orbay signed the Armistice of Mudros on October 30, ending World War I for the Ottoman Empire. The government did not last long, and İzzet Pasha resigned just before the occupation of Istanbul.

References 

Committee of Union and Progress
1918 establishments in the Ottoman Empire
1918 disestablishments in the Ottoman Empire